Carbamate poisoning is poisoning due to exposure to carbamates. Carbamates are typically used as pesticides; however, some also have medical uses. Symptoms may be similar to organophosphate poisoning.

References

Poisoning and certain other consequences of external causes
Carbamates